David Nikuradze (Georgian: დავით ნიკურაძე) (born November 2, 1975) is a television news journalist.

Career
Nikuradze was the only journalist from Georgia who covered the military campaigns in Iraq and Afghanistan.
He also covered Hurricane Katrina and its aftermath and the United States presidential elections in 2004, 2008, 2012 and 2017. Nikuradze has interviewed many high-profile figures including US President George W. Bush in White House before his official visit to Georgia.

Nikuradze has produced several documentary films, among them 9/11 Aftermath and US Aviation Security, Alaska, and Georgian-Ossetian Conflict and Economic Rehabilitation, the only documentary made in Tskhinvali by Georgian media since the first military conflict ended in South Ossetia.

Nikuradze reported on Avian Influenza cases from Turkish hospitals and made complete news coverage from Vatican about the funeral of Pope John Paul II. In 2005 he interviewed the family of jewelry retailer BVLGARI and produced a short documentary feature about the fashion business in Italy. He also covered the death of Michael Jackson in California and 2011 Attacks in Norway.

Since 2004, Nikuradze has been the Washington, D.C. correspondent for Rustavi 2.

Previously he reported for Radio Free Europe, Voice of America, was a senior correspondent for Rustavi 2, and served as a television news producer and newspaper reporter in the country of Georgia.

Notes

External links
Georgian journalist thinks of home, Rocky Mountain News
"Interview of the President by David Nikuradze"
"Hurricane Katrina aftermath"
"Nikuradze reports for CNN about New Year celebrations in Georgia"

1975 births
Journalists from Georgia (country)
Living people